Epitymbia alaudana is a species of moth of the family Tortricidae. It is found in Australia.

The wingspan is 18 mm. The forewings are whitish-brown with reddish-brown markings, partly edged and spotted with dark fuscous. The hindwings are deep ochreous, towards the termen irrorated (speckled) with fuscous.

References

Moths described in 1881
Epitymbiini